Sir Francis Hutchinson, 1st Baronet (1726-1807) was an Irish politician, Member of Parliament for Jamestown from 1783 to 1790.

References 

1726 births
1807 deaths
Irish MPs 1783–1790
Baronets in the Baronetage of Ireland
Members of the Parliament of Ireland (pre-1801) for County Leitrim constituencies